Mariska Halinda (born 28 March 1994) is an Indonesian taekwondo practitioner. She is a two-time gold medalist at the Southeast Asian Games.

Career 

She competed in the women's 57 kg event at the 2014 Asian Games held in Incheon, South Korea. In this competition she was eliminated in her first match by Samaneh Sheshpari of Iran. She represented Indonesia at the 2015 Summer Universiade held in Gwangju, South Korea where she won one of the bronze medals in the women's 53 kg event.

At the 2016 Asian Taekwondo Olympic Qualification Tournament held in Pasay, Philippines, she failed to qualify for the 2016 Summer Olympics in Rio de Janeiro, Brazil as she was eliminated from the competition in her second match.

In 2017, she won one of the bronze medals in the women's 53 kg event at the Islamic Solidarity Games held in Baku, Azerbaijan. In the same year, she also competed in the women's bantamweight event at the 2017 World Taekwondo Championships held in Muju, South Korea. She was eliminated in her third match by Radwa Reda of Egypt. Later that year, she won one of the bronze medals in the women's 53 kg event at the 2017 Asian Indoor and Martial Arts Games held in Ashgabat, Turkmenistan.

In 2018, she won one of the bronze medals in the women's 53 kg event at the Asian Taekwondo Championships held in Ho Chi Minh City, Vietnam. She also represented Indonesia at the 2018 Asian Games in Jakarta, Indonesia in the women's 53 kg event where she was eliminated in her second match by Laetitia Aoun of Lebanon.

References

External links 
 

Living people
1994 births
Place of birth missing (living people)
Indonesian female taekwondo practitioners
Asian Games competitors for Indonesia
Taekwondo practitioners at the 2014 Asian Games
Taekwondo practitioners at the 2018 Asian Games
Medalists at the 2015 Summer Universiade
Universiade medalists in taekwondo
Universiade bronze medalists for Indonesia
Islamic Solidarity Games medalists in taekwondo
Islamic Solidarity Games competitors for Indonesia
Asian Taekwondo Championships medalists
Southeast Asian Games gold medalists for Indonesia
Southeast Asian Games silver medalists for Indonesia
Southeast Asian Games bronze medalists for Indonesia
Southeast Asian Games medalists in taekwondo
Competitors at the 2015 Southeast Asian Games
Competitors at the 2017 Southeast Asian Games
Competitors at the 2019 Southeast Asian Games
Competitors at the 2021 Southeast Asian Games
21st-century Indonesian women